Jason M. Vanderhaden is a retired petty officer of the United States Coast Guard who served as the 13th Master Chief Petty Officer of the Coast Guard from May 17, 2018 to May 19, 2022. As MCPOCG, Vanderhaden served as the principal advisor to the Commandant of the Coast Guard on all enlisted personnel matters. As a matter of protocol, this gave him precedence equal to that of a three-star officer (vice admiral).

Assignments
Since enlisting in the Coast Guard in May 1988, MCPOCG Vanderhaden has served in a number of positions, including:

Command Master Chief, Deputy Commandant for Mission Support (DCMS), Washington, DC
Command Master Chief, Pacific Area, Alameda, CA
Command Master Chief, 13th Coast Guard District, Seattle, WA
Command Master Chief, Coast Guard Base Honolulu, Honolulu, HI
Instructor, Chief Petty Officer Academy, Petaluma, CA
, Portsmouth, NH
Coast Guard Station Ponce de Leon Inlet, New Smyrna Beach, FL
, Port Angeles, WA
Air Station Humboldt Bay, McKinleyville, CA
USCGC CHEYENNE, St. Louis, MO
Air Station Clearwater, Clearwater, FL
Coast Guard Loran Station Iwo Jima
Coast Guard Food Service Specialist "A" School, Petaluma, CA
Coast Guard Station Jones Beach, Freeport, NY
Coast Guard Recruit Basic Training, Cape May, NJ

Education
Vanderhaden is a graduate of Class 114 of the Coast Guard Chief Petty Officer Academy, the National Defense University’s Keystone Command Joint Senior Enlisted Leader Course, the Harvard Kennedy School Leadership in Homeland Security Course and other service-related schools. Vanderhaden holds a Bachelor of Science from Excelsior University. Vanderhaden is also a graduate of the International Academy of Gourmet Chefs where he was honored to be Valedictorian of the graduating class of 2018.

Family
Vanderhaden and his wife have two adult children who are both currently serving in the United States Coast Guard.

Awards and decorations

8 gold service stripes.

References

Year of birth missing (living people)
Living people
Excelsior College alumni
Master Chief Petty Officers of the Coast Guard
Recipients of the Coast Guard Distinguished Service Medal
Recipients of the Humanitarian Service Medal
Recipients of the Legion of Merit
Recipients of the Meritorious Service Medal (United States)